Hassan Sesay may refer to:

Hassan Koeman Sesay (1986–), Sierra Leonean international football player
Hassan Mila Sesay (1987–), Sierra Leonean international football player